Peter Ďuriš (born 10 April 1981) is a retired Slovak football midfielder. He formerly played for Ozeta Dukla Trenčín and Spartak Trnava, and has represented Slovakia at under-21 level.

Ďuriš appears in RTVS, Slovak public broadcaster, during televised national team or club international fixtures as well as major tournaments, like UEFA Euro 2020, as an expert analyst and panel member.

References

1981 births
Living people
People from Nemšová
Sportspeople from the Trenčín Region
Association football midfielders
Slovak footballers
FC Spartak Trnava players
AS Trenčín players
Spartak Myjava players